HD 82514, also known as HR 3790, is a solitary, orange-hued star located in the southern constellation Antlia. It has an apparent magnitude of 5.86, allowing it to be faintly seen with the naked eye. Based on parallax measurements from the Gaia spacecraft, it is estimated to be 279 light years away from the Solar System.

HD 82514 has a stellar classification of K3 III, indicating that it is an evolved red giant. HD 82514 has an iron abundance 44% above solar levels, making it metal enriched. The star is believed to be a member of the thick disk.

This object is designated as CD −35°5751BC, which makes it a double star itself. It consists of two low mass stars separated by 2.3 " from each other. However, the system is not related to HD 82514, having a smaller parallax. HD 82514 is located within the boundaries of the open cluster Turner 5. However, it is only a field star.

References

Antlia
K-type giants
082514
3790
046736
CD-35 05751
Double stars
Antliae, 11